Veronika Machová (born 17 August 1990) is a Czech beauty pageant contestant from Rokycany who won Miss World Czech Republic 2010 on Saturday 20 March 2010. She is a student of Pedagogical Faculty, Charles University in Prague.

Machová competed in Miss World 2010 in China.

Personal life
On 22 December 2012 she gave birth to a son Denis. On 20 June 2015 she married his father, Ice hockey player Roman Červenka.

References

1990 births
Living people
Miss World 2010 delegates
People from Rokycany
Czech beauty pageant winners
Charles University alumni
Czech female models
Czech people of Russian descent